Erich Bäumler (6 January 1930 – 18 September 2003) was a German footballer.

Career
Bäumler earned his first and only cap for Germany on 13 June 1956 in a friendly match against Norway, which finished with a 3–1 win.

Honours 
 German championship: 1958–59
 European Cup: runners-up 1959–60
 Oberliga Süd: 1958–59

References

External links
 Erich Bäumler at eintracht-archiv.de

1930 births
2003 deaths
German footballers
Germany international footballers
Eintracht Frankfurt players
1. FSV Mainz 05 players
1. FSV Mainz 05 managers
Association football forwards
German football managers
People from Weiden in der Oberpfalz
Sportspeople from the Upper Palatinate
Footballers from Bavaria
West German footballers
West German football managers